Kolpotocheirodon is a genus of characins endemic to the uppermost Paraná, Paraguaçu and São Francisco basins in the central Brazilian Plateau. They feed on small invertebrates. Both species in the genus are considered threatened by Brazil's Ministry of the Environment.

Species
The currently recognized species in this genus are:

 Kolpotocheirodon figueiredoi L. R. Malabarba, F. C. T. Lima & Weitzman, 2004
 Kolpotocheirodon theloura L. R. Malabarba & Weitzman, 2000

References

Characidae
Endemic fauna of Brazil
Freshwater fish of Brazil